Baptist News Global is an independent Baptist news agency. It was founded in 2014 as a merger of Associated Baptist Press (ABP), which was founded in 1990, and the Religious Herald, which was founded in 1828. The Herald served as a journal for Virginia Baptists and was most recently affiliated with the Baptist General Association of Virginia.

Baptist News Global is a Cooperative Baptist Fellowship partner. Its predecessor, Associated Baptist Press, was founded by Baptist journalists as an autonomous self-supporting entity in 1990, shortly after the Cooperative Baptist Fellowship split from the Southern Baptist Convention.

References

External links
Website

Baptist organizations in the United States
1990 establishments in Tennessee
News agencies based in the United States
Christian organizations established in 1990
Christian organizations established in 2014
Publications established in 1828